Bozan is a village in the Dazkırı District, Afyonkarahisar Province, Turkey. Its population is 420 (2021).

References

Villages in Dazkırı District